The 16th Light Cavalry is a regiment of the Armoured Corps, a primary combat arm of the Indian Army. Prior to India gaining independence from the British in 1947, it was a regular cavalry regiment of the British Indian Army. It was formed in 1776 and is the oldest armoured regiment raised in India. The 16th Light Cavalry saw service in a number of conflicts ranging from the Second Anglo-Mysore War in 1781 to World War II. It has a number of battle honours including "Punjab 1965" earned during the Indo-Pakistani War of 1965.

History

Formation
The regiment was raised prior to 1776 as the 3rd Regiment of Native Cavalry in the service of the Nawab of Arcot, Muhammad Ali Khan Wallajah. In 1780, while under service with the British East India Company, it formed part of the force that defeated Hyder Ali during the Second Anglo-Mysore War and was awarded battle honours for the Battle of Sholinghur, Battle of Mysore, Battle of Carnatic and the Battle of Seringapatam for service during the Anglo-Mysore Wars. 
After the Anglo-Mysore Wars the regiment was next in action during the Third Anglo-Burmese War and were awarded the Battle Honour of Burma 1885-87.

Early 20th Century
During World War I (1914–1918) the regiment remained in India for the defence of the North West Frontier but they did send drafts to other Indian cavalry regiments serving in France and the Middle East. In 1919 the regiment was involved in the brief Third Afghan War, for which they were awarded the battle honour of Afghanistan 1919. In 1923, the regiment was selected for ‘Indianisation’, wherein British officers were finally replaced by Indian officers and this became the first Indian cavalry regiment to be officered by Indians.

World War II
During World War II the regiment was employed in the defence of India having converted from horses to armour at Quetta in 1941.

In 1945 they were selected to undertake operations in Burma. Within three weeks the regiment covered a distance of 3,500 miles from Quetta to the banks of Irrawaddy River and was personally complimented by General Slim, the Fourteenth Army commander.

In Burma the regiment were 14th Army troops and were also attached to the 255th Indian Tank Brigade, the brigade formation was;
 
116 Royal Armoured Corps (formed from the Gordon Highlanders) - Sherman tanks. 
7th Light Cavalry - Stuart
16th Light Cavalry  - Humber and Daimler armoured cars (B squadron).

Post Independence

During the Indo-Pakistani War of 1965, the regiment was part of the 1 Armoured Brigade and took part in the Battle of Phillora and Battle of Gadgor. In a major tank battle fought at Gadgor on 8 September, and a subsequent engagement at Alhar Railway Station, they destroyed 16 Patton Tanks of the enemy, against a loss of 6 tanks of their own. 2 officers, 1 JCO and 14 other ranks of the unit were killed in these actions and many wounded. The regiment won the Theatre Honour 'PUNJAB 1965'. The gallantry awards won by its officers and men comprised 1 Vir Chakra, 1 Sena Medal, 8 Mention-in-Dispatches and 3 Commendation Cards from the Chief of Army Staff.

In the Indo-Pakistani War of 1971, the regiment with its Centurion tanks fought the war under the 16th Independent Armoured Brigade in Shakargarh Sector.

Seven Vijayanta tanks from 16 Cavalry fought in Amritsar during Operation Blue Star. At least three entered the Golden Temple compound to provide illumination and machine gun fire, but eventually deployed their main guns against the fortified Akal Takht building.

During a terrorist attack in Samba on 26 September 2013, three terrorist attacked the officers' mess of the regiment. The three terrorists were killed, but the unit lost one officer and three men. Lt Col Bikramjeet Singh was conferred with Shaurya Chakra posthumously.

Affiliations
The regiment was affiliated with the Madras Regiment in 2003 and with INS Talwar, the lead ship of the modern Talwar (modified Krivak) class frigates in  2005.

Composition
During its more than 200 years of existence, the regiment has seen many changes of organisations and designations. Manned originally by men from the Madras Presidency, its composition was changed in 1903 to Rajputs, Jats and Deccani Muslims. Since Independence, the regiment has retained its original South Indian composition.

Lineage
1776 – Regiment of Cavalry (Stevenson's), Nawab of Arcot's Army
1784 – 3rd Madras Native Cavalry
1784 – 1st Madras Native Cavalry
1786 – 4th Madras Native Cavalry
1788 – 2nd Madras Native Cavalry
1819 – 2nd Madras Light Cavalry
1886 – 2nd Regiment of Madras Lancers
1901 – 2nd Madras Lancers
1903 – 27th Light Cavalry
1922 – 16th Light Cavalry
1947 – Allocated to India at independence and partition, continues in service as 16th Light Cavalry

Battle honours
The battle and theatre honours of the 16th Light Cavalry are:
Pre-World War I
 Sholinghur
 Carnatic
 Mysore
 Seringapatam
 Burma 1885-87
World War I and later
 Afghanistan 1919
The Second World War
 Meiktila
 Capture of Meiktila
 Defence of Meiktila
 Rangoon Road
 Pegu 1945
 Sittang 1945
 Burma 1942-45.
Indo Pak Conflict 1965
 Punjab 1965

Notable Officers
Major General Thakur Sheodatt Singh
Major General Hira Lal Atal - became the first Adjutant-General of independent India
Major General Enaith Habibullah - First Commandant of the National Defence Academy, Khadakwasla
Major General Ghanshyam Singh
Lieutenant General Shiv Dev Verma - First Commandant of Defence Services Staff College, GOC 15 Corps
Lieutenant General Mohinder Singh Wadalia - the first Deputy Chief of the Army Staff
Lieutenant General Har Prasad  - Commissioned into the 3rd Cavalry Regiment, commanded the regiment between 1949 and 1952, went on to become Adjutant-General and subsequently Vice Chief of the Army Staff
General Jayanto Nath Chaudhuri  - 5th Chief of the Army Staff, commanded the unit from September 1944 
Lieutenant General Khem Karan Singh  - General Officer Commanding-in-Chief Central Command
General Vishwa Nath Sharma  - 14th Chief of the Army Staff
Lieutenant General Arun Kumar Gautama  - Commissioned into the regiment in June 1958, briefly commanded the regiment from May 1974 to October 1974. Later took over command of 81 Armoured Regiment. Commanded 34 Armoured Brigade, 29 Infantry Division and 33 Corps. GOC-in-C Central Command from April 1994 to April 1995 and GOC-in-C Western Command from April 1995 till October 1996.

Notes

References
 Kempton, C. (1996). A Register of Titles of the Units of the H.E.I.C. & Indian Armies 1666–1947. Bristol: British Empire & Commonwealth Museum. .
 Gaylor, J. (1992). Sons of John Company: The Indian and Pakistan Armies 1903–1991. Stroud: Spellmount Publishers Ltd. .

External links
 Uniforms of the late 19th Century
 
 https://web.archive.org/web/20160303182855/http://www.wolftree.freeserve.co.uk/Burma/Burma.html

British Indian Army cavalry regiments
Honourable East India Company regiments
Indian World War I regiments
Indian World War II regiments
Military units and formations established in 1776
Armoured and cavalry regiments of the Indian Army from 1947
R